I Want You to Know may refer to:

"I Want You to Know" (Fats Domino song), 1957
"I Want You to Know" (Per Gessle song), 1997
"I Want You to Know" (Zedd song), 2015, featuring Selena Gomez
"I Want You to Know", a 1989 song by Julian Lennon from the album Mr. Jordan